Ocú District is a district (distrito) of Herrera Province in Panama. The population according to the 2000 census was 15,936. The district covers a total area of 625 km². The capital lies at the city of Ocú.

Administrative divisions
Ocú District is divided administratively into the following corregimientos:

San Sebastián de Ocú (capital)
Cerro Largo
Los Llanos
Llano Grande
Peñas Chatas
El Tijera
Menchaca
Entradero del Castillo

References

Districts of Panama
Herrera Province